El Dakhleya Sporting Club, is an Egyptian sports club based in Abbassia, Cairo, Egypt. The club is mainly known for its football team, which currently plays in the Egyptian Premier League, the major league in the Egyptian football league system.

The club was promoted to the Egyptian Premier League for the first time in their history during the 2010–11 season of the Egyptian Second Division, after finishing first in their group. They remained in the top league since then until they were relegated in 2019.They were promoted to the Egyptian Premier League once again in the 2022-2023 season.

Current squad

External links
Team's profile – goalzz.com
El-Dakhley logo

Football clubs in Cairo
2005 establishments in Egypt
Multi-sport clubs in Egypt